John Matheson (1917–2013) was a Canadian lawyer, judge and politician who helped develop both the maple leaf flag and the Order of Canada.

John Matheson can also refer to:
John Archibald Matheson (1844–1919), Canadian politician
John Matheson (bishop) (1901–1950), British  Roman Catholic clergyman who served as the Bishop of Aberdeen
Jack Matheson (1924–2011), Canadian sports journalist